Dr. B. R. Ambedkar is a 2005 Indian biographical film in Kannada language, based on the life of Indian social reformer, jurist, academic-politician, B. R. Ambedkar. The film covers the period from his birth right up to his death. The actress Tara plays the role of Ambedkar's first wife Ramabai Ambedkar, while actress Bhavya plays Savita Ambedkar, his second wife. The film is directed by Sharan Kumar Kabbur.

Cast 
 Vishnukanth B. J. as Dr. Babasaheb Ambedkar
Bhavya as Savita Ambedkar
Tara as Ramabai
 C. Ashwath
Datthathreya
Padma Vasanthi
 Rajeshwari
 M. N. Swamy
 Ammanapura
 Pallakki Radhakrishna
 Dr. Purushottham
 Gururaj Hosakote
Biradar
 Shivakumar Aradhya
 Rajashekar
 Master Manu
 Master Sandeep
 Master Bharath
 Master Ramprasad
 Master Guruprasad

Awards
 Karnataka State Film Awards 2005–06
 Best Male Dubbing Artist – Ravindranath
 Special Award by Jury

Songs 
All the songs are composed by Abhiman and written by Siddalingaiah, Goturi and Vishnukanth.

See also 
 Dr. Babasaheb Ambedkar
 Ramabai
 Ramabai Bhimrao Ambedkar

References 

2005 films
2000s Kannada-language films
Films about B. R. Ambedkar
Cultural depictions of B. R. Ambedkar
Cultural depictions of Mahatma Gandhi